The Winsford Academy (simply referred to as Winsford Academy and formerly The Winsford E-ACT Academy) is an 11–16 mixed secondary school with academy status in Winsford, Cheshire, England. It was established in September 2010 following the amalgamation of the two predecessor schools; Verdin High School and Woodford Lodge High School. It is located on the campus of the former Verdin High School on Grange Lane that was established in 1970 and was initially one component of a two-campus school, with history spanning from its original founding as Verdin Technical School in 1895.

In September 2013, the academy moved into a new, £20 million purpose-built school which includes 60 classrooms with flexible learning spaces; a 400-seat theatre in the Performing Arts Centre; Learning Resource Centre; sports facilities; science labs; drama and dance studios; music rehearsal rooms; media suites; art studios; technology workshops; and a Sixth Form Centre (formally). In addition to this, the academy has spent £1.7 million on ICT.

History 

The Winsford Academy was established in September 2010 following the amalgamation of the two predecessor schools; Verdin High School and Woodford Lodge High School. Its history dates back to 1895, overseeing a series of name changes as well as changes to its education and buildings.

Verdin Era: 1895–2008 
The Verdin Era spans from 1895 to 2008 and partially to 2010 – all name changes to the school retained the term 'Verdin' from its original founders; The Verdin Family. The school was initially known to residents of Winsford as the 'Tec', but later, the term 'Verdin' had been used to refer to the school, rather than the family which founded it.

Origins 
During the 1890s, there was a growing demand for technical education and an attempt was made by William Henry Verdin, of Darnhall Hall in Darnhall, to convert Darnhall School into a science and technical school, but was rejected in 1893.

Sir Joseph Verdin, 1st Baronet and his brothers, Robert and William ran a family salt business known as Joseph Verdin & Sons (formerly Joseph and Richard Verdin), co-founded by their father, Joseph and his brother, Richard. They owned six salt plants in various locations throughout Cheshire, employed over 1,000 people and produced approximately 353,000 tons of salt annually; it was the largest salt manufacturer in the United Kingdom by 1881. Having few descendants, they used their wealth to benefit the local community.

In 1889, The Verdin Trust was established by Sir Joseph Verdin to compensate people for subsidence caused by brine pumping. However, in 1891 the Brine Pumping (Compensation for Subsidence) Act was introduced to provide compensation for owners of property, thereby rendering the Trust redundant. As a result, Sir Joseph Verdin decided to use the money in other ways which includes the construction and development of the Verdin Technical Schools in Winsford and Northwich – the one in Winsford, known as Verdin Technical School, was a prototype for a second and larger one in Northwich, that eventually opened in 1897 as Verdin Technical Schools & Gymnasium (latterly in use as Cheshire School of Art and Design, which closed in 2012).

The location for the Verdin Technical School in Winsford was determined when a site was bought adjacent to the Over Board School near the junction of High Street and Grange Lane. The design of the building was identified via a 'best design' competition that was won by Messrs Woodhouse and Willoughby, Architects, of Manchester. The construction was left to Messrs James Fowles and Sons, of Winsford and the building began with the foundation stone being laid down on 4 August 1894 by William Henry Verdin, Joseph's brother. On 8 August 1895, the building was officially opened by the Duke and Duchess of Westminster. The foundation stone and an inscription marking the opening ceremony can still be seen at the front of the building.

Verdin Technical School: 1895–1906 
The Verdin Technical School opened on 9 September 1895 enrolling 43 students on the first day. It housed four separate, but overlapping institutions, consisting of a day school, evening classes, gymnasium and a laundry. It "grew slowly at first before gaining a reputation throughout the years as one of the most enterprising in Cheshire".

Woodford Lodge: 1971–2008 

Woodford Lodge High School (initially Woodford Lodge County Comprehensive School and Woodford Lodge County High School) was established in 1971 on a 30-acre site in the outskirts of Winsford, when it was a developing town with an increasing population. Its name remained until 2008 and partially to 2010.

Federation: 2008–2010 
The former Local Authority, Cheshire County Council undertook an extensive review of educational provision and surplus places during 2007 under the Transforming Learning Communities Programme. The outcome of the review resulted in the decision to Federate Verdin High School and Woodford Lodge High School that was officially completed in January 2008, under the name 'Winsford High School Federation'. The Federation was led and managed by a Principal and a single Governing Body of 21 Governors. Both schools had a site headteacher and senior managers were appointed to the Federation, however, most aspects of provision were managed on one site.

The Federation was established in preparation for another proposal, the establishment of an all-through school in Winsford by 2012. The proposal would bring together primary, secondary and special provision in Winsford as one educational establishment with hopes it would be supported by Building Schools for the Future (BSF) programme. However, due to central government uncertainties, there has been a delay in the entry of 19 local authorities into the programme, including Cheshire West and Chester Council. As a result, funding has not been available for the all-through proposal.

On 19 April 2008, it was announced that Mr Martin Howlett was appointed as Principal of the Winsford High School Federation, and the two site headteachers appointed were Mr Paul Harrington for Verdin High School and Mr John Foreman for Woodford Lodge High School.

Both Verdin High School and Woodford Lodge High School retained their names under the Winsford High School Federation when it was established in January 2008, and its uniforms remained the same. However, under the Federation, Verdin High School was known as 'Verdin Site' and Woodford Lodge High School was known as 'Woodford Site'. The Federation had its own logo as well as two identical logos with the site names underneath to represent both schools. The former websites for both schools (www.verdin.cheshire.sch.uk and www.woodford.cheshire.sch.uk) became virtual learning environments (VLEs), with a new Federation website (www.wsf.cheshire.sch.uk) that represented and provided information for both schools respectively.

On 3 March 2010, it was announced that the two Federated schools would close to make way for an Academy by as early as September 2010. There would also be a new £20 million school building that will accommodate 1,700 students (1,500 for 11–16 and 200 for post-16) and is expected to be built on a site behind the Verdin Exchange. The site was once earmarked for former Local Authority, Cheshire County Council's original plan of a £73 million all-through school, which was ruled out due to a lack of available central funding. The proposed Academy would initially run from the two existing school sites and Cheshire West and Chester Council are still hoping that "the Academy could still be the first stage of an eventual 'all-through education concept', which will include special schools and special needs pupils". A six-week public consultation programme on the proposed closure and commence this month.

Proposed academy 
On 10 March 2010, the Local Authority, Cheshire West and Chester Council issued a document as the first part of the formal public consultation process and aims to provide as much information as possible on the proposal to close the two Federated schools on 31 August 2010, and replace them with one Academy on 1 September 2010 to serve the Winsford area. It also seeks to gather views from students, parents, staff, governors, the local community and other key stakeholders who are interested in the proposal. The public consultation is designed to make sure that all those involved can see and understand why the proposal is being put forward and have the opportunity to comment on and/or object to the proposal. The consultation will last 6 weeks through March/April 2010, allowing the council to gather as much feedback as possible. During this period, the sponsors will run a separate consultation on the proposed Academy.

A key highlight in the proposal shows a decline in student numbers with over 600 empty places at the two Federated schools when combined, and there would be no additional funding to support the other options which have been considered. However, the academy programme "provides significant capital investment for either a new building or adaptation and refurbishment". The council is supporting the proposal and have identified a sponsor who would have the appropriate skills and resources to support the academy in the longer term. The sponsor will be responsible for running the academy, should the proposal be approved and E-ACT are interested in being the sponsor, having also confirmed it would adopt the Local Authority's admission arrangements, meaning anyone could apply for a place.

The proposed Academy would have 1,700 places (1,500 for 11–16 and 200 post-16) and students at the two closing Federated schools would automatically transfer to the new academy from 1 September 2010, should they wish to do so. The academy would open utilising the two existing school sites and the Local Authority will work with the sponsor to ensure smooth transition. Pupils that are due to transfer in Year 7 to Verdin or Woodford in September 2010 would be offered a place at the new academy. If the proposed Academy does not go ahead, the two Federated schools would continue under its Winsford High School Federation and "other proposals would have to be developed to deal with the need to improve performance".

On 21 April 2010, it was announced that the six-week public consultation is due to end today. However, concerns were raised by parents who attended a meeting held by Winsford Town Council on 19 April 2010, that 'inadequate' information was provided by Cheshire West and Chester Council. For example, Lynne Miller, who attended with her daughter – a student at Woodford Lodge, said: "We have not been provided with the information as promised. Everyone has a view but without the information how on earth can we respond?" The town council supports parents' concerns and are wanting the consultation period to be extended to December. Should the consultation not be extended, a decision will be made in a weeks' time on the proposed Academy.

On 28 April 2010, it was announced that the six-week public consultation had come to an end, which was extended by five days. A meeting will be held today by the Cheshire West and Chester Council Executive Committee in Ellesmere Port where the fate will be decided in a vote open to parents and the public. Following on from the previous concerns on the two Federated schools mentioned in the first part of the formal public consultation in March 2010, the council also reported an 'alarming drop' in applications within the town (Winsford) of its two Federated schools, losing approximately a third of its secondary schools' pupils to Northwich and Middlewich. The Sixth Form numbers have also dropped, resulting in the two Federated school's decision to not offer Year 12 study from September this year, regardless of whether the proposed Academy goes ahead or not. Should the vote result in the 'go ahead', a six-week period will follow to allow further representations from parents and other stakeholders before a final decision is made.

On 5 May 2010, it was announced that Cheshire West and Chester Council Executive Committee had voted in the 'go ahead', deciding on a 'statutory notice' for the closure of the two Federated schools. A six-week and final phase of consultation will now commence on the proposed Academy.

On 3 June 2010, it was announced that a consultation evening was held by E-ACT last week for parents of pupils at Woodford Lodge High School. Representatives from the sponsor were there to provide information on the proposed Academy and addressed concerns to those affected by the proposal. For example, "parents and councillors have criticised the way the plans have been carried out after E-ACT was prevented from providing information by regulations governing publicity about anything considered political during the General Election". Mr Martin Howlett, Principal of Winsford High School Federation said: "there were obviously concerns that were put forward in the public airing but afterwards there was a general feeling of positivity. It's important to remember that we remember people don't always like change". A second consultation evening will be held by E-ACT for parents of pupils at Verdin High School on 7 June 2010. The E-ACT consultation ends on 2 July 2010 and a consultation document is available from the two Federated schools, containing information on the proposal and an option to comment via a pre-paid response form.

On 5 July 2010, it was announced that following a meeting which was held on 2 July 2010 at Winsford Lifestyle Centre, and after hearing all-party support from Town and Borough Councillors and school Governors, members of Cheshire West and Chester Council Executive Committee have 'unanimously' agreed to the proposed plans to close the two Federated schools on 31 August 2010, subject to the Education Secretary making an agreement for a new Academy on 1 September 2010. Mrs Barbara Coldrick, Vice Chairman of the Federated Board of Governors told the meeting: "The Governors agree that the proposed Academy will offer more opportunities for our young people – both now and in the future". A preferred site for the academy has not yet been chosen, however executive members have agreed to work together to examine the two sites in consideration; Verdin High School and Verdin Exchange and will work with local councillors to address potential problems of access and egress. The site must be agreed by 31 August 2010 to allow the Government to decide on an Academy for Winsford in time for the scheduled opening in September 2010.

On 4 August 2010, it was announced that the two Federated schools will reopen as The Winsford E-ACT Academy in September 2010, which sees the two school names and its Federation being made redundant. It will operate from the two existing school sites before the proposed plans for a new school building, that would accommodate all students, is complete. Verdin High School is the current favourite site in the bid for the new building, but has raised some concerns among residents in the surrounding areas. However, they have been reassured they 'won't be left in the dark' over plans for the new building. Councillor Charlie Parkinson, of Winsford Town Council, said: "certain issues can't be addressed until funding for a new building is secured ... The Government has agreed for certain cosmetic improvements to make the schools look more appealing for the students in September, but this won't affect the money for the new school". He addresses the council are 100 per cent behind the new building, but the location of the new build is currently unknown to anyone. He says that "until we find out exactly where this school is going to be we can't really make too much of an issue about it".

Changes to upcoming academy 
On 18 August 2010, it was announced that Andrew Kilpatrick was appointed as interim Principal of The Winsford E-ACT Academy. He addresses that some changes have been made to the two existing school sites to provide an enhanced learning environment and said "we have redesigned parts of the school to teach in half year groups, taking about 80 children in one class and splitting them up to work in smaller groups". Some of the other changes include provision for the upcoming Year 7's, along with Year 8 and 9 students who will be taught at the former Verdin High School site – newly renamed as Town Site. Whereas, Year 10 and 11 students will be split across both sites, including the former Woodford Lodge High School site – newly renamed as West Site. The academy will incorporate a 'House System' and will be split into four Houses; each comprising students from all year groups and will encompass an ethos of 'healthy competition' from sports to debating societies, performance groups and music. Another change includes the development of 'inclusion zones' at both sites that will be staffed by trained teachers to manage children who misbehave.

On 26 August 2010, it was announced that new uniforms will be provided to Academy students for free and will be ready to collect from the 'Town Site' between 9am to 12pm and 5pm to 7pm on 1, 2 and 3 September 2010. Students will receive a blazer, tie and two pairs of trousers for the boys and either two skirts or two pairs of trousers (or a mixture of each) for the girls. A basic PE kit will also be provided and includes a polo shirt and one pair of black shorts/skort. The four Houses will each have its own colour consisting of blue, red, green, and yellow. Students will represent their House with these colours on their tie and will also be added to their blazer trim for the two types of prefects that are also being introduced. These are: 'Academy Prefects' who will show them on both their cuffs and collars and 'House Prefects' who will show them on their cuffs.

Academy: September 2010–present

Opening 

The Winsford E-ACT Academy opened on 6 September 2010 with an Open Day at the 'Town Site', uniting students from the two Federated schools for the first time, wearing their new uniform which was provided by the academy free of charge. Andrew Kilpatrick, Interim Principal said: "We've worked hard to get everything in place to start the new term, with a new look and new uniform". He also has high hopes for the academy, which will specialise in music and mathematics and provide 1,500 places for students aged 11 to 16, with 200 spaces allocated for post-16 students. Michael Gove, Education Secretary, has signed the funding agreement giving education sponsor E-ACT responsibility for the academy.

New build 
On 27 October 2010, it was announced that funding for the new building remains uncertain even though it was promised a £20 million new building following the establishment of the academy, earmarked for the former Verdin High School site by 2013. The academy was told they would have to wait until January for a decision but remains optimistic despite the Government's Spending Review announced last week on 20 October 2010, which reduced the spending for new school buildings by 60%. Vicky Atkinson, deputy director for Business and Finance at the academy says "obviously, we're still hoping for a rebuild but whatever happens there will be a substantial financial investment. It may be a new building, a 100 per cent refurbishment or a 95 per cent refurbishment, we won't know until January".

On 23 December 2010, it was announced that plans for the new building will go ahead after securing the funding of £20 million from the Government. Lord Hill, Schools secretary announced that the cash will be available to fund the building on the site of the former Verdin High School. In a letter sent to the academy's sponsor, E-ACT, said: "As you know, we have had to take some tough decisions on spending in order to address the public expenditure deficit. The resources available to us for capital projects are extremely limited. In the light of these constraints, we have decided that the priority for academy expenditure should be determined by the condition of the buildings and the plans for pupil places".

On 14 January 2011, it was announced that staff and students are celebrating the start of the new term last week after returning to the news that they had received the funding, which was announced just days before Christmas. Andrew Kilpatrick, Interim Principal said the announcement was a "huge relief". The new building is anticipated to be completed by the end of 2013 however Kilpatrick said: "There is no reason to suspect the original timeline, to be in the school by 2013, need to be suspended. Indeed it could be earlier than that. Obviously the new building will be state-of-the-art and with significant regards to eco friendliness and will allow us to use a range of information technologies".

On 26 March 2011, it was announced that Andrew Taylor-Edwards who has held the post of Vice Principal since September 2010, was appointed as Principal of the academy, and will replace current Interim Principal, Andrew Kilpatrick, after the Easter break.

Closure of former Woodford Lodge building 
On 1 July 2011, marked the final day of education at the West Site (former Woodford Lodge High School building). From September 2011, all Academy students will be educated at the Town Site (former Verdin High School building) for two years before moving into the proposed new building. Andrew-Taylor Edwards, Principal said: "It is a poignant moment for all Academy students, staff and parents. School-life is such an important part of all our lives, irrespective of our individual experiences. I still drive past my old Secondary School in Wrexham and every time I do, the memories come flooding back". To mark the event, lessons were suspended at lunchtime and both students and staff spent the afternoon on the school fields with food, music, prizes and wall/shirt-signing. The ties of the former Woodford Lodge High School also made a final appearance.

On 8 July 2011, a ceremony was held to mark the closure of the West Site which was organised by Jayne Kettle. 180 parents, staff and ex-staff attended, with speeches from Steve Meeks (ex-Head), Martin Fleetwood (ex-Deputy Head) and John Hanley, the first ever appointment to Woodford Lodge over 40 years ago. Andrew Taylor-Edwards, Principal said: "Yes, it's sad to say goodbye to the old building but bricks and mortar do not carry the spirit of all that has been nurtured since 1971. That will not go away, it is carried in all who have experienced it. Indeed, as Mr Hanley described it, the old schools of Woodford Lodge High School and Verdin High School are the grandparents of the new' [The] Winsford E-ACT Academy; a young and hungry offspring with a bright future ahead." Performances were held on the day from current Academy students who had started at Woodford Lodge.

On 11 August 2011, it was announced that supporters of New Images Youth Centre on Nixon Drive, adjacent to the former Verdin High School, which was saved from closure following its sale and subsequently became part of Verdin in 2003, now run by the youth service provider, Connexions (Cheshire and Warrington), 'fear the worse' on the uncertainty of whether it would remain. It may be demolished when construction of the new building commences, with details which are expected to be released this week. Campaigners have "accused Cheshire West and Chester Council of doing nothing to safeguard the future of the centre should the current building stand in the way of Academy plans".

On 17 August 2011, it was announced that plans for the new building will be revealed next month and will be submitted to the Government in September before a public consultation that will commence in the autumn, where the local community will be able to view artist's impressions of the new building that will be situated on the former Verdin High School site. Partnerships for Schools (PfS); a delivery agent for the Government's capital investment programmes into schools, is expected to receive a feasibility study which is being prepared by Cheshire West and Chester Council in partnership with the academy and sponsors E-ACT. Subject to planning approval, the construction will start in spring 2012 and is anticipated to be completed by the end of summer 2013. The demolition of the former Verdin building will then begin and should be completed by April 2014.

On 13 October 2011, it was announced that as part of the first phase of public consultations, the local community will have the opportunity to learn more about the plans for the new building, share their views, concerns such as increased traffic and parking with many proposals now under consideration by the design team, as well as any questions they may have at a drop-in session, with representatives from the academy, Cheshire West and Chester Council and the proposed main contractor, Kier. It will be held at the Town Site on 19 October 2011, between 5:30pm and 8pm. A planning application is due to be submitted in December with construction starting in spring 2012; to be completed by the end of summer 2013, along with an anticipation for the whole project to be completed by summer 2014. On 9 November 2011, it was announced a second drop-in session will be held on 16 November 2011 from 6:30pm. It will address the new build project as well as planning for the future of the town, in which Winsford has been selected to pilot neighbourhood planning powers as part of the Government's Localism Bill, through a partnership between Winsford Town Council, Cheshire West and Chester Council and Weaver Valley Partnership Board. It will allow the local community to have a further say in shaping the future of how the land in the town will be developed.

Planning permission 
On 12 March 2012, it was announced that the academy was given planning permission to go-ahead for the £20 million building project, which was given 'unanimous support' from Cheshire West and Chester Council's strategic planning committee on 8 March 2012. The project will commence next month and is anticipated to be completed by September 2013. In addition to the designs of the new build mentioned previously, the sports hall will be five-court and a fitness suite will also be developed that would be open to the local community. The access off Joyce Avenue, the former main entrance of Verdin High School and at present the academy, which was the biggest problem among residents, will be closed. The access off Grange Lane would become the new main entrance that will allow two-way traffic for staff and visitors and a one-way drop-off 'vehicular loop' or drop-off points; vehicles would exit on Nixon Drive. On the High Street, new pelican crossings will be installed to make it safer for pupils who walk to school.

On 14 March 2012, posts marking the corners of where certain parts of the new building will go, were inserted into the ground by Kier building contractors, providing the academy a "first sense of the physical build". The academy took the opportunity to walk down what would be the 'Street' which at present, is the running track. On 16 March 2012, it was announced that Andrew-Taylor Edwards, Principal who has been a teacher at the school since 1999, has shared his excitement over the new build project following the go-ahead, and said: "It is great news and confirmation of all the hopes and ambitions we have for pupils, staff, and the community … There has been a lot of talk of about new buildings for young people in Winsford for a number of years now. People can become a little desensitised when they are so used to barriers being put up, but to finally have confirmation for something like this is just so exciting. The kids can't quite believe it. I was looking at the drawings with pupils the other day when one of them asked in such disbelief if we were going to get it."

On 28 March 2012, Cheshire West and Chester Council have announced a £2.5 million investment to improve the A54 High Street and Grange Lane traffic signal junction, which is expected to be completed when the new academy building opens in September 2013. It will include additional crossing facilities and lanes on all approaches to improve the capacity and the flow of traffic. The changes are being made to help support the extra traffic created by the academy and support future developments in the area.

Closure of former Verdin building 
On 16 July 2013, it was announced that around 60 Academy dance students from Year 9 and 10, performed a choreographed flash mob at the front of the former Verdin High School building to mark the end of an era, and to celebrate their move into the new building in September. Laura Wilkinson, Head of Dance discusses the academy's excitement of the new build and said: "We've got a brand new dance studio with sprung floors and a new theatre. It's really going to let us do lots more productions. Dance is one of our most popular subjects at the moment. It's really developed over the last five years. Over 100 students are involved now." The former Verdin building is set to be demolished and landscaped by March 2014.

Completion 
On 15 August 2013, it was announced that the academy's new building is ready for its first school term, with the Sixth Form's intake increasing to 150, having started from scratch two years ago. The official handover was marked complete on 16 August 2013 and will open to students on 9 September 2013. Andrew Taylor-Edwards, Principal said: "Kier Construction and Cheshire West and Chester Council have made a potentially stressful process absolutely painless. Great project management from both partners and our own Andrew Duncalf, Debbie Beaumont and Martin Bott. Great to meet the architect today and share his delight at the end product. A small list of snags to work through before the big open…"

On 9 September 2013, the academy opened its doors of the new building for its induction day, with 1,100 students inducted. Andrew Taylor-Edwards, Principal said: "The building is finally complete because the students are here. It's not just the bricks and mortar that makes a school, it's the students and the staff – the spirit of the school is now here. Today was our induction day and it went brilliantly. It was a day of excitement and celebration".

Change of sponsor 
On 25 February 2014, it was announced that the academy is among ten Academies to be handed back to the Government amid concerns over the E-ACT chain's standards.

On 27 February 2014, it was confirmed that the academy is one of ten Academies who will no longer be sponsored by E-ACT. The Department for Education (DfE) is now brokering with other Academy chains to set up the academy with a new sponsor.

On 9 July 2014, it was confirmed that the academy's new sponsor, with effect from 1 September 2014, will be The Fallibroome Multi-Academy Trust in Macclesfield. E-ACT will cease to be the academy's sponsor from 31 August 2014. As a result, only minor changes were made with the removal of the word 'E-ACT' from the school name and logo.

Suspend of Sixth Form provision 
On 14 January 2015, it was announced that The Winsford Academy has made the 'difficult decision' to suspend Sixth Form provision from September 2016 due to funding cuts and declining pupil numbers, and will revert to being an 11–16 school. Mr Andrew Taylor-Edwards, Principal told the Chester Chronicle that "while the proportion of students opting to stay on for Sixth Form study has remained constant, recent cuts to funding have put 'increasing pressure on the financial viability of providing our small post-16 provision'". He also said that "we have always prided ourselves in our ability to offer a small Sixth Form provision, allowing students an intimate setting where every student is known and where class sizes are small". The academy will not be offering Year 12 study to current Year 11 students from September this year, while remaining fully committed to current Year 12 Sixth Form students who will start their second year of study.

Potential re-establishment 
In May 2015, it was announced that the Sixth Form was to be re-established at the earliest opportunity. Concerns were also made that poor prior decisions had resulted in overstaffing and budgetary difficulties.

In July 2016, it was announced that a feasibility study has been carried out and the Academy Governors and Sponsor had launched a consultation on the future of the Sixth Form, announcing intentions to re-establish provision in 2019. The last Year 13 students left in  2016 and the governors are already planning on what needs to be done to re-establish Sixth Form provision. The feasibility study report points out that according to Department for Education guidelines, the academy would need to reapply to open a Sixth Form and would need to meet the criteria for an application, including proving it can recruit and sustain 200 students from the area, offer at least 20 academic A Level subjects and remain financially viable.

Motto 
The Winsford Academy's motto is "Succeed, Aspire, Learn Together" and its acronym makes the word 'SALT', which is based upon the towns mining heritage and The Verdin Family who founded the Verdin Technical School in 1895 that developed into the present Academy. They owned six salt plants in various locations throughout Cheshire and was the largest salt manufacturer in the United Kingdom by 1881.

Curriculum 
The Winsford Academy's subjects include syllabuses for Key Stage 3 and Key Stage 4:

 English
 Mathematics
 Science (Science, Biology, Physics, and Chemistry)
 Performing Arts (Drama, Music, and Dance)
 ICT & Business (ICT, Computing, and Business Studies)
 Humanities (Geography, History, Leisure & Tourism, Religious Education (RE), and Sociology)
 Physical Education (PE)
 Modern Foreign Languages (MFL – French and Spanish)
 Health Studies (Child Development, Food & Nutrition, Food Studies, Health & Social Care, Hospitality & Catering, Psychology, and Children's Play, Learning & Development)
 Design & Technology (D&T) (Art, Construction, Engineering, Photography, Product Design, Media Studies, and Textiles)

Leadership 
A comprehensive restructure and rightsizing of the teaching and support staff was completed in August 2015 and a new organisation model was introduced to simplify the school structure and increase accountability for subject leadership. The leadership group comprises a Principal; two Vice Principals (Curriculum & Standards and Care, Support & Guidance) and seven Assistant Principals (Science & Technology, English, Maths, Achievement & Intervention, Sixth Form, Enrichment & Engagement, Humanities & SMSC). There are 60 teaching staff, including the leadership team.

Pastoral system 

The Winsford Academy has a pastoral system which consists of five Year Heads and four Progress Managers. Through the Heads of Year team, students are provided with pastoral care and support with services such as child welfare, attendance support, mentoring and counselling all being available throughout the academy day. Students also have access to their Coach, Head of Year and Progress Manager. The Progress Managers are responsible for progress tracking, engagement and enrichment, and competition of the House System.

House system 
The Winsford Academy has a house system consisting of four 'Houses', which, as a specialism of Performing Arts and a specialist music school, are named after English composers; Britten (Benjamin Britten), Purcell (Henry Purcell), Elgar (Edward Elgar) and Sullivan (Arthur Sullivan). Depending on what House each student is in determines the colour of their tie and blazer trim for prefects. Britten are recognised in blue; Purcell red; Elgar green; and Sullivan yellow.

Each House is structured vertically to include coaching groups from all Years 7 to 13. Within each coaching group all pupils belong to the same House. Coaches are placed in the same House as their coaching group. Teachers without coaching responsibilities will also belong to a House team.

Specialist school 
Performing Arts is the main specialism of The Winsford Academy, in addition to being a Specialist Music School. The two predecessor schools; Verdin High School had a specialism in Technology that was attained via sponsorship by The Ogden Trust, and Woodford Lodge High School had no specialism.

Sponsor 

The Winsford Academy is sponsored by The Fallibroome Multi-Academy Trust in Macclesfield.

Governing body 
The Winsford Academy has a Governing Body and its Committees meet at least three times per half-term and convene as ad hoc Committees dealing with a wide range of academy business, and are a regular presence in the academy.

Facilities 

The Winsford Academy moved into a new, £20 million purpose-built school in September 2013. From the very outset of designing the new build, the academy are committed to creating a space which serves the whole community, before and after the traditional school day and during the weekends. The academy's new build features facilities which may be of interest to a range of community groups such as sporting groups, keep-fit enthusiasts, drama groups, dance troupes, adult educators, film enthusiasts, art & craft groups, reading circles, community forums and rehearsing musicians.

The interior of the build features a monochrome design with vivid, industrial splashes of colour throughout and comprises a large and spacious central corridor area with glass-fronted classrooms on either side. Open spaces, balconies and a 'café-culture' canteen also feature. The academy's approach to outdoor learning sees a garden, orchard, allotment and natural habitat zones.

The Facilities include:

 A 400-seat studio theatre with open stage, raked, retractable seating and full audio visual capability. The theatre also has a giant screen and projector
 A drama studio (black box studio) that backs onto the studio theatre, separated by a dividing moveable wall to allow for larger expansion to the stage area
 A dance studio with professionally equipped wooden sprung floor, full-length mirror with bar and air conditioning. A sound system is also available on request
 A fully equipped gymnasium
 A five-court sports hall including full-size basketball court, five badminton courts, cricket nets, and a five-a-side football court
 A large field with 5 football pitches, 6 tennis courts, a rugby pitch, a running track and a floodlit 3G all-weather pitch
 Two tarmac Multi-Use Games Areas marked for tennis and netball and is also suitable for basketball and fitness groups. Tennis, netball and basketball nets are available

Awards 

The Winsford Academy has achieved a range of awards. These are:

 Investors in People
 Specialist Schools and Academies Trust | Excellence and Diversity
 Go4it | Today's Pupils – Tomorrow's Innovators
 International School Award | Intermediate
 Maths & Computing
 Music Colleges
 International Network for Educational Transformation (iNet)
 Cheshire & Warrington: Inspiring Apprenticeship Promise

Partnerships 
The Winsford Academy has established a range of partnerships. These are:

 Winsford Education Partnership
 Winsford Town Council
 Cheshire West and Chester
 Cheshire Constabulary
 University of Chester
 British Council
 England Rugby
 Rugby Football Foundation (with Prince Harry as its Patron)
 Microsoft IT Academy (ITA)
 Vale Royal School Sport Partnership
 The Hive
 Camps International
 Weaver Vale Housing Trust
 Teacher Development Trust
 Hugh O'Brian Youth Leadership (HOBY) – UK
 Royal Horticultural Society (RHS)
 Sale Sharks

 Darnhall Community
 Whole Education
 Incredible Edible Network – Winsford
 Over Allotments and Leisure Gardeners' Association
 The PiXL Club
 Dingle Recreation Centre
 Barrington Stoke Young Editors
 Cheshire Library Service
 The Duke of Edinburgh's Award
 UK Youth Parliament (UKYP)
 The Transformation Trust
 Springboard FutureChef
 Quality Learning Partners
 TEDx
 The Royal Cheshire County Show
 Premier League Reading Stars

Notable alumni 

Verdin Technical School
 Gertrude Maud Robinson ( Walsh), organic chemist
 E. T. Whitehead, political activist

Verdin County Grammar School
 Malcolm Arnold OBE, athletics coach
 Janet Dean ( Gibson), Labour MP from 1997 to 2010 for Burton
 Jim Walker, professional footballer and physiotherapist
 Geoff Barnett, professional footballer

Verdin County Comprehensive School
 David Hanson, Labour MP since 1992 for Delyn

Verdin High School
 Conrad Ellis, co-founder, lead vocalist and guitarist in rock band, The Luka State
 Liam Haynes, actor

Woodford Lodge High School
 Sam Bell, co-founder and bassist in rock band, The Luka State and actor
 Andrew Roger Carson, screenwriter, producer and director

The Winsford Academy
 Charlie Kirk, professional footballer

References

Further reading 
 David Cogger (1995). Verdin School, Winsford, 1895–1995. Verdin High School.

External links 
 
 Trust Financial statement

Winsford
Secondary schools in Cheshire West and Chester
Academies in Cheshire West and Chester
Educational institutions established in 1895
1895 establishments in England